

Johannes Hintz (1 October 1898 – 21 May 1944) was a German general during World War II. He was also a recipient of the Knight's Cross of the Iron Cross of Nazi Germany. Hintz was injured in a car-accident on 14 May 1944 in Paris and died on 21 May 1944. He was posthumously promoted to Generalleutnant.

Awards and decorations

 Knight's Cross of the Iron Cross on 29 July 1940 as Oberstleutnant and commander of Flak-Regiment 101

References

Citations

Bibliography

 

1898 births
1944 deaths
Military personnel from Metz
People from Alsace-Lorraine
Luftwaffe World War II generals
German Army personnel of World War I
Recipients of the clasp to the Iron Cross, 1st class
German military personnel of the Spanish Civil War
Recipients of the Knight's Cross of the Iron Cross
Road incident deaths in France
Condor Legion personnel
Lieutenant generals of the Luftwaffe
20th-century Freikorps personnel